Gyrinops is a genus of nine species of trees, called lign aloes or lign-aloes trees, in the Thymelaeaceae family. They are native to Southeast Asia and the Indian Subcontinent.

The genus Gyrinops is closely related to Aquilaria and in the past all species were considered to belong to Aquilaria.

Agarwood production
Together with Aquilaria the genus is best known as the principal producer of the resin-suffused agarwood. The depletion of wild trees from indiscriminate cutting for agarwood has resulted in the trees being listed and protected as an endangered species.

Projects are currently underway in some countries in southeast Asia to infect cultivated trees artificially to produce agarwood in a sustainable manner. In Indonesia, for example, there have been proposals to encourage the planting of gahara, as it is known as locally, in eastern Indonesia, particularly in the province of Papua.

Species
Gyrinops caudata 
Gyrinops decipiens 
Gyrinops ledermanii 
Gyrinops moluccana 
Gyrinops podocarpus 
Gyrinops salicifolia 
Gyrinops versteegii 
Gyrinops vidalii 
Gyrinops walla

References

External links

Thymelaeoideae
Malvales genera